The 2021 Campeonato Carioca de Futebol was the 118th edition of the top division of football in the state of Rio de Janeiro. The competition is organized by FERJ. It began on 16 January 2021 and ended on 22 May 2021. The tournament was played behind closed doors due to the coronavirus pandemic in Brazil. In order to lower the number of matches to be played, this edition of the Campeonato Carioca faced another change in format and regulations.

Flamengo, the defending champions, won a record-breaking 37th Campeonato Carioca title and their third title in a row.

Participating teams

Format
The competition format suffered several alterations in each stage, in order to minimize the number of matches to be played. The relegation play-offs, Taça Independência and Torneio Extra were scrapped, and the main phase will be played in a single round-robin, instead of a double one.

Preliminary stage
The preliminary stage of the tournament was contested as a double round-robin among the four worst-placed teams of the 2020 competition and the two teams promoted from the 2020 Série B1. The winner of the preliminary stage qualified for the main phase of the competition while the remaining five were relegated to the 2021 Série A2 (the second tier being rebranded from B1 to A2).

Main stage
In the main competition, the twelve clubs will play each other on a single round-robin. This round-robin will be the Taça Guanabara. The last placed club will be relegated to the 2021 Série A2. While the top four clubs qualify for the final stage, the next four clubs (5th to 8th places) will qualify for the Taça Rio. In the Taça Rio, the 5th-placed club will face the 8th-placed club, and the 6th-placed will face the 7th-placed. In the final stage, the winner of the Taça Guanabara will face the 4th-placed club, while the runners-up will face the 3rd-placed club.

In both of these four-team brackets (the Taça Rio and the final stage), the semifinals and finals will be played over two legs, without the use of the away goals rule. In the semifinals of both the Taça Rio and the final stage, the better placed teams on the Taça Guanabara table will advance in case of an aggregate tie. In the finals of both brackets, there will be no such advantage; in case of an aggregate tie, a penalty shoot-out will take place.

Preliminary stage
America, Americano, Cabofriense and Friburguense were the four lowest placed teams in the 2020 Campeonato Carioca main tournament. Nova Iguaçu and Sampaio Corrêa qualified from the 2020 Série B1. The preliminary stage was contested from 16 January 2021 to 20 February 2021.

Main stage

Taça Guanabara 
<onlyinclude>

Taça Rio – Final stage

Final stage

Top goalscorers

References

Campeonato Carioca seasons
Carioca